American country music singer Kenny Chesney has released nineteen studio albums (including a Christmas album), two live albums, two greatest hits albums, and 70 singles (counting "The Tin Man", which was released twice). Ten of his albums consecutively reached number one on the US Billboard Top Country Albums chart. Fourteen of them have been certified gold or higher by the Recording Industry Association of America (RIAA). His highest-certified albums are No Shoes, No Shirt, No Problems (2002), When the Sun Goes Down (2004), and his first Greatest Hits compilation, each certified 4× Platinum for shipping four million copies in the US. Chesney has recorded for four labels: Capricorn Records, BNA Records, Columbia Records Nashville, and Warner Records Nashville.

Of Chesney's seventy singles, all but four have charted in the Top 40 on the US Billboard Hot Country Songs and/or Country Airplay chart. Thirty-one of his singles have reached number one, beginning with "She's Got It All" in 1997. "The Good Stuff" (2002) and "There Goes My Life" (2003–04) are his longest-lasting number ones on the charts at seven weeks each. The former was also the number one Hot Country Song of 2002 according to the Billboard Year-End charts. All but two of his singles from the mid-1998 "That's Why I'm Here" onwards have charted on the Billboard Hot 100 as well, with twenty-six of his singles peaking inside the Top 40. "Out Last Night" (2009) is his highest peak on that chart at number 16.

Chesney also charted in the Top 10 in mid-2004 as a guest artist on the collaboration "Hey, Good Lookin'". He has also reached the lower regions of the Hot Country Songs with multiple album cuts, including two charity singles in 1998 and seven cuts from his Christmas album All I Want for Christmas Is a Real Good Tan (including the number 30 title track).

Studio albums

1990s albums

2000s albums

2010s albums

2020s albums

Live albums

Compilation albums

Singles

1990s

2000s

2010s

2020s

Other singles

Featured singles

Promotional singles

Other charted and certified songs 
These songs were charted from unsolicited airplay or download sales. "Beer in Mexico", "Shiftwork" and "I'm Alive" were later released as official singles.

Christmas songs

Videography

Music videos

Guest appearances

Notes

References

Country music discographies
Discographies of American artists
Discography